Dylan "DJ" Collier (born 27 April 1991) is a New Zealand rugby union and rugby league player. Collier currently plays for Waikato and represents New Zealand in rugby sevens.

Rugby league career
A goal kicking winger, Collier was a New Zealand Warriors junior and played in their 2011 National Youth Competition Grand Final winning side.

In 2012 Collier played for the Auckland Vulcans in the NSW Cup.

Rugby union career
Collier signed for Waikato in 2013 and made his New Zealand rugby sevens debut in 2015 after playing for Waikato at the National Sevens Championship. He joined the Southland Stags for the 2016 Mitre 10 Cup.

Collier was part of the All Blacks Sevens squad that won a bronze medal at the 2022 Commonwealth Games in Birmingham.

References

New Zealand rugby league players
Rugby league wingers
Auckland rugby league team players
New Zealand rugby union players
Waikato rugby union players
New Zealand international rugby sevens players
Southland rugby union players
1991 births
Living people
New Zealand male rugby sevens players
Rugby sevens players at the 2018 Commonwealth Games
Commonwealth Games rugby sevens players of New Zealand
Commonwealth Games gold medallists for New Zealand
Commonwealth Games medallists in rugby sevens
Rugby sevens players at the 2020 Summer Olympics
Olympic medalists in rugby sevens
Olympic silver medalists for New Zealand
Medalists at the 2020 Summer Olympics
Olympic rugby sevens players of New Zealand
Rugby sevens players at the 2022 Commonwealth Games
Medallists at the 2018 Commonwealth Games
Medallists at the 2022 Commonwealth Games